Anne Wellesley, Countess of Mornington (née Hill-Trevor; 23 June 1742 – 10 September 1831) was an Anglo-Irish aristocrat. She was the wife of Garret Wesley, 1st Earl of Mornington and mother of the victor of the Battle of Waterloo, Arthur Wellesley, 1st Duke of Wellington.

Life
Anne was born the Hon. Anne Hill-Trevor in 1742. She was the eldest daughter of the banker Arthur Hill-Trevor, 1st Viscount Dungannon, and his wife Anne Stafford. Her mother was notably 
eccentric, and her financial extravagance was a source of worry to a family already struggling with mounting debts. She was a friend of Lady Eleanor Butler and Sarah Ponsonby, the famous Ladies of Llangollen.

Family
Anne married Garrett Wesley, the Earl of Mornington, in 1759. The marriage was said to be a happy one. Anne and Mornington had nine children together, and seven of them survived to adulthood:
 Richard, Viscount Wellesley (20 June 1760 – 26 September 1842); later 1st Marquess Wellesley, 2nd Earl of Mornington.
 Arthur Gerald Wellesley (? – 1768), named after his maternal grandfather and died at six or seven.
 The Hon. William Wellesley (20 May 1763 – 22 February 1845); later William Wellesley-Pole, 3rd Earl of Mornington, 1st Baron Maryborough.
 Francis Wellesley (1767 – 10 March 1770), died at three.
 Lady Anne Wellesley (13 March 1768 – 16 December 1844), married (1) The Hon. Henry FitzRoy (younger son of Charles FitzRoy, 1st Baron Southampton), (2) Charles Culling Smith.
 The Hon. Arthur Wellesley (c. 1 May 1769 – 14 September 1852); later 1st Duke of Wellington.
 The Revd and Hon. Gerald Valerian Wellesley (7 December 1770 – 24 October 1848), father of George Wellesley.
 Lady Mary Elizabeth Wellesley (1772 – 1794), died at 22.
 The Hon. Henry Wellesley (20 January 1773 – 27 April 1847); later 1st Baron Cowley.

Lord Mornington died in 1781, leaving her and their eldest son Richard, who was 21 then, to raise the rest of the family. She disliked Arthur when he was young. She said that he was "food for powder and nothing more" and constantly worried about his future. In 1785, Lady Mornington went to Brussels to live, as a way to economise. She took Arthur with her and sent him to the Royal Academy of Equitation at Angers, in Anjou, after she returned to Britain in 1786. She was granted a pension of £600 in 1813 by Parliament after Arthur's success in the Peninsular War.

Her husband's titles were in the Irish peerage, entitling him to sit in the Irish House of Lords, which disbanded following the Act of Union 1800 with Great Britain. Four of her five sons who survived to adulthood earned titles in Peerage of the United Kingdom, entitling them to sit in the United Kingdom House of Lords, while the fifth, Gerald Valerian, became a bishop, giving him precedence comparable to a peer.

References

1742 births
1831 deaths
18th-century Irish people
19th-century Irish people
Wellesley family
Irish expatriates in England
Mornington
Daughters of viscounts
Parents of prime ministers of the United Kingdom